Laofa railway station (落垡站) is a fourth-class station at 87 km on Jingshan railway. The station was built in 1895. It is located in Laofa town, Langfang city, Hebei province, China.

References

Railway stations in Hebei
Railway stations in China opened in 1895
Stations on the Beijing–Shanghai Railway